Strobilomyces strobilaceus, also called Strobilomyces floccopus and commonly known as old man of the woods, is a species of fungus in the family Boletaceae. It is native to Europe and North America. Fruit bodies are characterized by very soft dark grey to black pyramidal and overlapping scales on the cap surface.

Taxonomy and naming
Strobilomyces strobilaceus is classified in the section Strobilomyces of the genus Strobilomyces. Species in this section are characterized by having spores that may be either smooth or with short spines or warts, ridges or reticulations. The ornamentation is reduced or absent in the suprahilar region—a depressed area near the hilar appendage.

It was first described scientifically by the Italian naturalist Giovanni Antonio Scopoli in 1770 as a species of Boletus.

Description
The cap surface is covered with dark grey to black erect scales. It is coloured like the cap and has a woolly surface and a thick, ascending annulus. The pores on the underside of the cap are hexagonal, coloured dirty white or grey. The flesh is thick and initially white, but will stain pink and then slate grey and black after exposure to the air. 

The dark brown to black spores are 9–15 by 8–12 μm, short elliptic and are covered with a mesh-like ornament.

Similar species
Strobilomyces confusus has a slightly smaller cap with smaller and stiff scales. Its spores have irregular ridges that resemble a partial mesh. The cap of Strobilomyces dryophilus is coloured a dull grey-pink to pinkish-tan and produces spores with a complete mesh.

Habitat and distribution
Strobilomyces strobilaceus is found solitary or in groups in deciduous as well as coniferous forests in low mountain ranges and alpine areas of Europe, North America and Asia (Iran and Taiwan). It is less common in lowlands. The fungus appears between August and October and young specimens are edible. Its taste is regarded as great.

Postage stamp
On February 27, 2014, the postal administration of Switzerland issued a 50-centime definitive postage stamp depicting Strobilomyces strobilaceus.

See also
List of North American boletes

References

External links

Boletaceae
Edible fungi
Fungi of Asia
Fungi of Europe
Fungi of North America
Fungi described in 1770